Gabazeleh (also Romanized as Gābāzeleh and Gabāzeleh; also known as Kābāzaleh) is a village in Mokriyan-e Sharqi Rural District, in the Central District of Mahabad County, West Azerbaijan Province, Iran. At the 2006 census, its population was 656, in 117 families.

References 

Populated places in Mahabad County